Algoma District School Board (known as English-language Public District School Board No. 2 prior to 1999) is a public school board in the Canadian province of Ontario. The school board is the school district administrator for the Algoma District.

Elementary schools

Blind River 

 Blind River Public School

Bruce Mines

 Arthur Henderson Public School

Chapleau

 Chapleau Public School

Desbarats

 Johnson-Tarbutt Central School

Echo Bay

 Echo Bay Central Public School
 Laird Central School

Elliot Lake

 Central Avenue Public School
 Esten Park Public School

Goulais River

 Mountain View Public School

Hornepayne

 Hornepayne Public School

Iron Bridge

 Iron Bridge Public School

Richards Landing

 St. Joseph Island Public School

Sault Ste. Marie

 Anna McCrea Public School
 Ben R. McMullin Public School
 Eastview Public School
 F.H. Clergue Public School (French Immersion, JK-3)
 Grand View Public School
 Greenwood Public School
 H.M. Robbins Public School
 Isabel Fletcher Public School
 Kiwedin Public School
 Northern Heights Public School
 Parkland Public School
 Pinewood Public School
 Queen Elizabeth Public School
 River View Public School
 R.M.Moore Public School
 Rosedale Public School (French Immersion, 4–8)
 Tarentorus Public School
 Alex Muir Public School (Closed)
 Aweres Public School (Closed)
 Bay View Public School (Closed)
 Étienne Brûlé Public School (Closed)
 Manitou Park Public School (Closed)
 William Merrifield Public School (Closed)

Serpent River

 Rockhaven School

Spanish

 Spanish Public School (Closed)

Thessalon

 Thessalon Public School

Wawa

 Sir James Dunn Public School

Intermediate schools

Desbarats

 Central Algoma Intermediate School

Sault Ste. Marie

 Korah Intermediate School
 Superior Heights Intermediate School
 White Pines Intermediate School

Secondary schools

Blind River 

 W.C. Eaket Secondary School

Chapleau

 Chapleau High School

Desbarats

 Central Algoma Secondary School

Elliot Lake

 Elliot Lake Secondary School

Hornepayne

 Hornepayne High School

Sault Ste Marie
 Korah Collegiate & Vocational School
 Prince Charles Secondary School (Adult Education)
 Superior Heights Collegiate & Vocational School
 White Pines Collegiate & Vocational School
 Alexander Henry High School (Closed in 2012)
 Bawating Collegiate and Vocational School (Closed in 2011)
 Sir James Dunn Collegiate and Vocational School (Closed in 2011)
 Lakeway Collegiate & Vocational School (as Sault Technical and Commercial High School in 1921 and closed 1987)

Wawa

 Michipicoten High School

See also
List of school districts in Ontario
List of high schools in Ontario

References

External links
 Algoma District School Board official website

School districts in Ontario
Education in Algoma District